Farscape is a science fiction television show.  Four regular seasons were produced, from 1999 to 2003.  Each season consists of 22 episodes.  Each episode is intended to air in a one-hour television timeslot (with commercials), and runs for 44 to 50 minutes.  The regular seasons were followed by Farscape: The Peacekeeper Wars in 2004, a 2 part miniseries with an air time of 3 hours. Several of the early episodes of Season One were aired out of the intended order. As the official Farscape website lists them in the production order as opposed to airing order, the list below reflects that.

Series overview

Episodes

Season 1 (1999–2000)

Season 2 (2000–01)

Season 3 (2001–02) 
The premiere of season three was preceded with a one-hour recap titled "Farscape Undressed" for new audiences.

Season 4 (2002–03)

The Peacekeeper Wars 

Following the series' unexpected cancellation in September 2002, a miniseries was produced to wrap up the season four cliffhanger and tie up some elements of the series in general. The Peacekeeper Wars was broadcast on October 17 and 18, 2004.

References

External links
 Episode list at Epguides.com
 Episode list at Farscape World

 
Farscape
Farscape